L'Etang is a village in the Loiret department in central France. It is part of the commune of Beaulieu-sur-Loire.

References

See also
Communes of the Loiret department

Villages in Centre-Val de Loire